Kimiko Date was the defending champion but lost in the semifinals to Lindsay Davenport.

Gabriela Sabatini won in the final 6–3, 6–4 against Davenport.

Seeds
A champion seed is indicated in bold text while text in italics indicates the round in which that seed was eliminated. The top four seeds received a bye to the second round.

  Lindsay Davenport (final)
  Gabriela Sabatini (champion)
  Kimiko Date (semifinals)
  Mary Joe Fernández (semifinals)
  Brenda Schultz (second round)
  Amy Frazier (second round)
  Amanda Coetzer (first round)
 n/a

Draw

Final

Section 1

Section 2

External links
 Singles and Doubles Main Draws

Women's Singles
Singles